The VR is a series of twin-turbo DOHC V6 automobile engines from Nissan with displacements of 3.0 and 3.8 L. An evolution of the widely successful VQ series, it also draws on developments from the VRH, JGTC, and Nissan R390 GT1 Le Mans racing engines.

DDTT series

VR30DDTT
Announced by Infiniti on December 15, 2015 the VR30DDTT was first made available in the Infiniti Q50 sedan, followed by the Infiniti Q60 coupé a year later. Both platforms come in a  version. It is on the Ward's 10 Best Engines list for 2017 and 2018.

Features:

 Aluminium block with arc sprayed mirror coating to cylinder bores
 Aluminium cylinder head
 Lightweight resin intake and lower oil pan
 Compact twin direct-mount turbos with integrated exhaust manifold and electronic wastegate actuator
 Twin water-to-air charge coolers with one /two  water pumps
 Electronically controlled variable displacement oil pump
 Intake: electronic Variable valve timing Control (VTC)
 Exhaust: hydraulic continuously variable VTC
 Fuel system: direct injection

Applications:

Production
Production of the VR30DDTT engine began in 2016 at the powertrain plant in Iwaki, Fukushima, Japan.

DETT series

VR38DETT
Designated the VR38DETT by Nissan, the engine was used from 2007–2022 in the Nissan GT-R and the limited production Nissan Juke-SV.

The VR38DETT featured 24 valves controlled by dual overhead camshafts (2 per cylinder head) with variable valve timing on the intake only. The block is cast aluminium with  plasma-sprayed cylinder liner bores. This coating provides a hard protective layer for the piston rings to slide on as the piston moves up and down during its power cycle. The turbine housings for the two IHI turbochargers are integrated into the exhaust manifolds to decrease weight and bolster vehicle balance. The engine also features a pressurized lubrication system controlled thermostatically.
The VR38DETT is equipped with a feedback control system that changes air fuel ratio depending on the engine load which has a significant effect on reducing the fuel consumption.

Other pertinent features of the VR38DETT include:
 Continuously variable valve timing control system (CVTCS) on intake valves
 Aluminum cylinder block with high-endurance/low-friction plasma-sprayed bores
 Iridium-tipped spark plugs
 Electronic drive-by-wire throttle
 Multi port fuel injection
 Pressurized lubrication system with thermostatically controlled cooling and magnesium oil sump
 Fully symmetrical dual intake and low back-pressure exhaust system
 Secondary air intake system to rapidly heat catalysts to peak cleaning efficiency
 50 State LEV2/ULEV

Applications:

VR38DETT NISMO Engine Tuning Menu Concept (2016)
It is a version of VR38DETT engine used in Nissan GT-R, with GT3-spec camshaft, connecting rod and connecting rod bolt, intercooler, intercooler piping, turbocharger, NISMO 1st and 2nd catalyzers, titanium muffler. 

The engine was unveiled in 2016 Tokyo Auto Salon.

Production
The engines are hand built by five specially trained mechanics called "Takumi Craftsmens" on a special line at Nissan's Yokohama plant and their names are badged on every GT-R engine. The cars are built at their Tochigi plant on a shared production line.

Engine reference

See also
 Nissan
 List of Nissan engines
 VQ Series
 Infiniti Q50
 Infiniti Q60
 Nissan Skyline
 Nissan Z (RZ34)
 Nissan GT-R

References 

VR
V6 engines
Gasoline engines by model